Up for Grabs is the second studio album by Australian band The Radiators. The album was 'Produced by Leo Productions' with the group's Fess Parker as 'Production Assistant'; it was engineered by Spencer Lee and David Hemming at Leo Recorders, Sydney. It was released in September 1981 and peaked at number 29 on the Australian Albums Chart and was certified gold.

Susan Molloy, writing in the Sydney Morning Herald, opined that the album was ‘quite appealing in the way they have restrained themselves from going overboard with the heavy metal sound. Instead, this album has some interesting experimental moments (from Kraftwerk?) and some cutesy songs… Up for Grabs is one of the better offerings from a veritable flood of local recordings.'

Track listing

Charts

References

The Radiators (Australian band) albums
1981 albums